The Irwin River is a river in the Mid West region of Western Australia. It was named on 9 April 1839 by the explorer George Grey, while on his second disastrous exploration expedition along the Western Australian coast, after his friend Major Frederick Irwin, the Commandant of the Swan River settlement, and later acting Governor of Western Australia from 1847 to 1848.

The headwaters of the Irwin are located below Canna near Pindar. The river flows west until discharging into Arurine Bay near Dongara.

The river passes through the Coalseam Conservation Park to the north of Mingenew which has a mixed geology of siltstones, claystones and sandstones that form stripes in the cliff faces formed by the river.

The river has four tributaries: Lockier River, Sand Plain Creek, Nangetty Creek and Mullewa Creek.

The river occasionally floods as it did in 1945 following a severe storm that swept over the area. The river broke its banks and caused extensive damage including the loss of 450 sheep that were swept away from a farm  that straddled the river.

References

Rivers of the Mid West region